Takyeh Moaven-ol-Molk (Persian:تکیه معاون الملک) is a takyeh and historical place located in Kermanshah city of Iran. It was built during Qajar era as a Shia mourning site. On 1 December 1975 Tekyeh Moaven al-molk was recognized as National monument of Iran. It is well known for its exclusive tiling, picturing Islamic era Ghazi (warrior), Battle of Karbala and Iranian kings such as Achaemenid kings and Persepolis. It has three main parts: Hussainiya, Zaeynabiya and Abbasiya. Museum of Anthropology of Kermanshah, and Clothes and Jewelry Museum of Kermanshah are located in Abbasiya.

Gallery

References 

Takyehs
National works of Iran
Tourist attractions in Kermanshah Province
Buildings and structures in Kermanshah
Buildings of the Qajar period